"Victory" is a song recorded by American hip hop recording artist Puff Daddy. The song was originally written by The Notorious B.I.G., Jason Phillips and Steven Jordan for his debut studio album No Way Out (1997). It features heavy use of mafioso-style lyrics, as was popular at the time. It features The Notorious B.I.G., who raps two verses, and Busta Rhymes, who raps the song's chorus. The song also heavily sampled the Bill Conti song "Going the Distance", which featured on the soundtrack to the movie Rocky making it a darker start to a rap album that featured many (at the time) club-standard singles. The song was released as a single in 1998, peaking at number 19 on the Billboard Hot 100. This song featured the last verses recorded by The Notorious B.I.G. before his 1997 death as these verses were recorded a day before his shooting. The song was used for the EA Sports video game, Fight Night 2004, and the 2K Sports video game, NBA 2K13 by Puff Daddy and the Family featuring The Notorious B.I.G. and Busta Rhymes. This was re-used for the soundtrack of NBA 2K18. It was also used on professional wrestling, for Masahiro Chono's Team 2000 faction in New Japan Pro-Wrestling.

Music video
The music video for the song was directed by Marcus Nispel on March 31, 1998 (although he was supposed to remain anonymous at the time of premiere) and is an homage to The Running Man. The almost eight-minute-long video featured cameos from Dennis Hopper as a New World Order dictator ("President Victor Castiglione") and Danny DeVito as a live action reporter. English socialites Tamara Beckwith and Tara Palmer-Tomkinson were also in the video. Hopper and Devito reportedly appeared in the video pro bono as a favor to Combs.

Sean Combs' character (known as "Contestant #5" or codename "PD") runs through the dark streets of the year 3002 AD, chased by armed gestapo-esque forces of Chase TV. At one point, Contestant #5 is cornered on a rooftop, where he decides to leap off instead of submitting to the armed troops.

Footage from Biggie's "One More Chance" video was used in "ghost" images, representing a flashback for Sean Comb's character. Busta Rhymes, dressed in black feathers, raps atop a statue representing Victoria, the goddess of victory. The Victoria statue overlooks the chase scenes. Biggie appears in the video only through archive footage due to his death a year earlier.

The production costs ran upwards of $2,700,000. It is listed as one of the most expensive music videos ever made.

Remixes and Freestyles
In 2002, 50 Cent and Lloyd Banks freestyled over the instrumental for their mixtape, No Mercy, No Fear, which Diddy used a year later as the official remix, "Victory 2004", for Bad Boy's 10th Anniversary... The Hits album.  This remix also has a new verse from P. Diddy.
In 2002, Mike Jones freestyled over the instrumental for Swishahouse's Before Da Kappa 2K2 mixtape.
In 2003, while not remixed, the song was used as the main theme in EA Sports Fight Night 2004.
In 2009, there was an unofficial remix leaked that featured 50 Cent, Lloyd Banks, Diddy, Busta Rhymes, The Notorious B.I.G., and also features Jay-Z rapping over Diddy's first lines.
In 2010, another unofficial remix titled "Legends" leaked which featured Diddy, 50 Cent, 2Pac and an unknown artist. The original "Victory" beat was replaced with a motivational-emotional Piano and String instrumental.
In 2010, British rapper Lowkey used the instrumental for his diss track The Warning which was aimed at Chip. The freestyle was a result of an altercation on Twitter between the pair.
In 2019, Shaquille O'Neal made a diss track against Damian Lillard called Second Round Knockout. Victory was used as a sample song.

Track listing

Victory (Remixes)
Victory (Album Version) (4:58)
Victory (Nine Inch Nails Remix) (5:33)
Producer, Featuring - Trent Reznor
Remix - Nine Inch Nails
Victory (Drama Mix) (4:58)
Vocals - Ron Grant, Terri Hawkins
Bad Boy's "Been Around The World" (Remix) (5:30)
Co-remix - Jay Garfield Additional Production By: Jesse Wilson
Featuring - Mase
Producer - Deric "D-Dot" Angelettie, Ron "Amen-Ra" Lawrence
Remix - Nashiem Myrick
Vocals - Carl Thomas

Charts

Weekly charts

Year-end charts

Certifications

|}

References

1997 songs
1998 singles
Sean Combs songs
The Notorious B.I.G. songs
Bad Boy Records singles
Songs written by Sean Combs
Songs written by the Notorious B.I.G.
Songs written by Jadakiss
Songs written by Nelly
Songs written by Bill Conti
Music videos directed by Marcus Nispel
Mafioso rap songs
Songs written by Stevie J